Thomson Newspapers Co v Canada (AG), [1998] 1 S.C.R. 877, is a leading Supreme Court of Canada decision on the right to freedom of expression in which the Supreme Court struck down a law that prohibited the publication, broadcast, or dissemination of opinion surveys within the last three days of a federal election campaign, as it violated section 2(b) of the Canadian Charter of Rights and Freedoms. The provision clearly restricted expression and was found to be too restrictive to be justified under section 1 of the Charter.

See also
 List of Supreme Court of Canada cases (Lamer Court)

External links
 

Canadian freedom of expression case law
Canadian Charter of Rights and Freedoms case law
Supreme Court of Canada cases
1998 in Canadian case law
Supreme Court of Canada case articles without infoboxes
Thomson Reuters